The consensus 1933 College Basketball All-American team, as determined by aggregating the results of three major All-American teams.  To earn "consensus" status, a player must win honors from a majority of the following teams: the Helms Athletic Foundation, Converse and College Humor Magazine.

1933 Consensus All-America team

Individual All-America teams

See also
 1932–33 NCAA men's basketball season

References

NCAA Men's Basketball All-Americans
All-Americans